FK Igalo is a Montenegrin football club based in Igalo, Herceg Novi municipality. The club was founded in 1929 and currently competes in the Montenegrin Second League.

History
Founded as Primorje in 1929, FK Igalo is among the oldest football clubs at the territory of Herceg Novi municipality. Until the seventies, FK Igalo played at the lower-rank Fourth League - South. First title of Fourth league champion, Igalo won in the 1975-76 season. That success gained them first-ever promotion to the Montenegrin Republic League, in which they spent most of the time until Montenegrin independence (2006).

In the 1987-88 season, FK Igalo won second place in the Republic League, with promotion to the newly established Yugoslav Third League. They competed only one season in Federal rank, and new success came during the 1995-96 season. That year, FK Igalo won the title of the Montenegrin Republic League champion, and gained first-ever promotion to the Second Yugoslav League. FK Igalo made that season double, with winning the Montenegrin Republic Cup. The team played one season in the Second League (1996–97), finished at the bottom of the table.

After independence, FK Igalo played as a member of the Montenegrin Third League until the 2010-11 season. That year, the club won the promotion to the Montenegrin Second League. Until now, FK Igalo became a standard member of the Second League, and biggest success in the club's history came at the 2014-15 season. After finished as a third-placed team in the Second League, FK Igalo played in the First League playoffs against FK Mornar. After losing 0-2 in the first match, FK Igalo surprisingly won the second match with the same result (2-0), but they lost chances for the First League promotion after penalties.

Mimoza Cup
Since 1973, every February, FK Igalo is a host of traditional Mimoza Cup, which hosted a numerous popular teams as Budućnost, Hajduk, Partizan, Crvena zvezda, Željezničar, Luzern and others. It's the oldest football tournament on the Montenegrin seacoast. All games are played at Stadion Solila.

Honours and achievements
Montenegrin Cup – 0
 runners-up (1): 2017–18
 Montenegrin Third League – 2
winners (2): 2010–11, 2019–20
 Montenegrin Republic League – 1
winners (1): 1995–96
 Montenegrin Fourth League – 8
winners (8): 1975–76, 1977–78, 1982–83, 1992–93, 1994–95, 1999-00, 2002–03, 2004-05
 Montenegrin Republic Cup – 1
winners (1): 1995–96

Players

Current squad

Notable players
For all former and current players with Wikipedia article, please see :Category:FK Igalo 1929 players.

Historical list of coaches

 Igor Raičević (2021–)
 Marko Vidojević (2020–2021)
 Miodrag Radanović (2020)
 Krsto Perović (2019–2020)
 Dušan Jevrić (2017–2019)
 Brajan Nenezić (2006–2017)
 Marko Vidojević (2016)
 Rešad Pepić (2015)
 Igor Raičević (2015)
 Petar Gušić (2014–2015)
 Mladen Milinković (2014)
 Vladimir Gaćinović (2013)
 Mihailo Vujačić (2011–2013)
 Dejan Perović (2009–2011)

Stadium

FK Igalo plays their home games at Stadion Solila. Until the middle of the nineties, football ground in Igalo was among amateur-pitches like neighbouring Stadion Opačica or Stadion Bijela. But, with FK Igalo promotion to the Second Yugoslav League, on old ground location was built new stadium with one terrace and numerous pitches around the main ground.
During the winter months, because of good climate and accommodation, the stadium is used for exhibition matches, tournaments, trainings and preparations of many football teams from the region (Montenegro, Serbia, North Macedonia, Albania, Kosovo, Bosnia and Herzegovina and Croatia).

See also
Stadion Solila
Igalo
Herceg Novi
Montenegrin Third League
Montenegrin clubs in Yugoslav football competitions (1946–2006)

References

Association football clubs established in 1929
Football clubs in Montenegro
1929 establishments in Montenegro